The Dorbott of Vacuo is a novel by Patrick Woodroffe published in 1988.

Plot summary
The Dorbott of Vacuo is a novel in which surreal landscapes form hazards.

Reception
Dave Langford reviewed The Dorbott of Vacuo for White Dwarf #100, and stated that "The illustrations are spiffy; the text puts it in the same class of eruditely funny "children's" books as Fungus the Bogeyman, which should be praise enough."

References

1988 novels